Ecseri út is a station on the M3 (North-South) line of the Budapest Metro. Next to the station there are the northern blocks of Attila József microraion. The station is named after the adjacent street Ecseri út. The station was opened on 20 April 1980 as part of the extension from Nagyvárad tér to Kőbánya-Kispest.

Connections
Bus: 181, 254E, 281
Tram:  3

References 
Budapest City Atlas, Dimap-Szarvas, Budapest, 2011, 

M3 (Budapest Metro) stations
Railway stations opened in 1980